The Amazing World of Gumball is a British-American animated sitcom created by Ben Bocquelet for Cartoon Network. The series concerns the lives of 12-year-old Gumball Watterson, an anthropomorphic blue cat, and adoptive goldfish brother Darwin, who attend middle school in the fictional city of Elmore, California. They often find themselves in various shenanigans around the city, during which they interact with fellow family members—younger sister Anais, mother Nicole, and father Richard—along with an extended supporting cast of characters.

Bocquelet based several of the series' characters on rejected characters from his previous commercial work while making its premise a mixture of "family shows and school shows", which Cartoon Network was heavily interested in. After Bocquelet pitched The Amazing World of Gumball to the network, Turner Broadcasting executive Daniel Lennard green-lit the production of the series. The show was produced by Cartoon Network Studios Europe, in association with Boulder Media (Ireland; season 1) and Studio Soi (Germany; seasons 2–6).

Gumball is noted for its intentional stylistic disunity, with characters designed, filmed, and animated using various styles and techniques, oftentimes within the same scene (stylized traditional animation, puppetry, CGI, stop motion, Flash animation, live-action, etc.). The series has received critical acclaim and developed a cult following, with particular praises for its extensive references to popular culture and internet culture, sarcasm, subtle innuendos, dark humor, and metahumor. Although it is a children's series, Gumball comments on topics that are often considered serious or mature, including philosophy, marriage, cyberbullying, political intolerance, mental illness, and the human condition.

On September 6, 2016, Bocquelet announced the series would end after season 6; he reaffirmed his position on Twitter in October 2018. However, Turner Northern Europe was unable to confirm the sixth season to be the show's last, which could make way for future episodes. Following the series finale, two miniseries were released: the six-episode Darwin's Yearbook in November 2019 and The Gumball Chronicles in October 2020. On February 17, 2021, Cartoon Network revealed that a television film based on the series was in development. On September 21, 2021, it was announced that a new spin-off series, to be a follow-up for both the show and the movie, had been greenlit for Cartoon Network and HBO Max alongside the film. On August 22, 2022, it was reported that the film would no longer be heading to HBO Max, but would be shopped to other outlets instead.

Production
When Cartoon Network Studios Europe was created in 2007, Ben Bocquelet was hired to help people pitch their projects to the network. However, when the studio decided to have its employees all pitch their own ideas, he decided to take some rejected characters he had created for commercials and put them together in one series set inside of a school. Daniel Lennard, vice president of Original Series and Development at Turner Broadcasting System Europe, was impressed by the premise and approved production of the series in 2009. The first series to be produced by Cartoon Network Studios Europe, making the show a British production, thirty-six episodes were produced for its first season in collaboration with Studio Soi, Dublin-based Boulder Media Limited, and Dandelion Studios. On February 17, 2021, the Cartoon Network Twitter account confirmed that a film based on The Amazing World of Gumball is in development.

Premise

The series revolves around the life of a 12-year-old cat named Gumball Watterson and his frequent shenanigans in the fictional American city of Elmore, accompanied by his adopted goldfish brother and best friend Darwin. Gumball's other family members—his intellectual sister Anais and stay-at-home father Richard, both rabbits, and workaholic mother Nicole, a cat—often find themselves involved in Gumball's exploits. Gumball attends school with his siblings at Elmore Junior High, where throughout the series he interacts with his various middle school classmates, most prominently his love interest Penny Fitzgerald.

One prominent feature of the series since its third season is "The Void", a dimension inside of Elmore where all the universe's mistakes reside. This includes references to aspects of reality as well as in-series elements. Rob is a background character from the first two seasons who became trapped in The Void after becoming "irrelevant". He later escapes in Season 3, after which he becomes Gumball's nemesis and main antagonist. He is shown to be aware of his fictional existence in the Season 4 episode "The Disaster", and his hatred towards Gumball is a result of his role as the protagonist.

Episodes

Crossovers
On September 17, 2015, series creator Ben Bocquelet announced on his Twitter page that a crossover episode with an unknown show would air as part of the fifth season. This turned out to be the episodes, "The Puppets", which features characters and settings from Don't Hug Me I'm Scared. Additionally, "The Copycats" featured the characters interacting with ones similar to those from Miracle Star, a Chinese clone of the show.

"The Boredom" featured characters from Clarence, Regular Show, and Uncle Grandpa making cameo appearances.

Gumball made a cameo appearance on the Uncle Grandpa episode "Pizza Eve", along with other Cartoon Network characters from currently running and ended cartoons.

Gumball made a cameo appearance on the OK K.O.! Let's Be Heroes episode and Cartoon Network special "Crossover Nexus", along with other Cartoon Network characters from currently running and ended cartoons.

Waiting for Gumball

Waiting for Gumball is a series of thirteen shorts based on The Amazing World of Gumball, or more specifically, "The Puppets".

Darwin's Yearbook

A six-episode miniseries called Darwin's Yearbook aired on Cartoon Network from December 14 to December 28, 2019. The miniseries features Darwin attempting to complete Elmore Junior High's yearbook by examining who he thinks should fill up the best spot. The miniseries predominantly consists of recycled clips from previous episodes of the original series presented in a clip show style.

The Gumball Chronicles
Another series of clip show episodes titled, The Gumball Chronicles, premiered on October 5, 2020, with The Curse of Elmore. On November 2, 2020, four more episodes (each beginning with Vote Gumball...and) themed around the 2020 United States presidential election were aired back-to-back.

Future
In an interview with The Times newspaper, series creator Ben Bocquelet mentioned plans for a feature film based on the series. However, after Bocquelet announced his departure from the show following the sixth season, he stated that he doubted a film would be made.

In March 2018, Bocquelet's interest in a Gumball film was seemingly revitalized as he stated that he "might have a good idea" for a film. He later added that he had two ideas, one for a potential theatrical film and one for a potential direct-to-video film.

On September 29, 2018, during a Q&A with the series director Mic Graves at Cartoon Network UK's 25th-anniversary screening, he confirmed that a script for The Amazing World of Gumball film is in the works. He also said that he hopes for the film to happen. Bocquelet retweeted a tweet which states that the script for a film based on The Amazing World of Gumball is being written, however, it was then unknown if the film would actually be made. After the season six finale "The Inquisition", was met with mixed reviews from fans of the series due to its cliffhanger ending, Bocquelet stated it was not his choice to conclude the episode that way, adding that it would be resolved if a film based on the series were produced.

On February 17, 2021, WarnerMedia announced that a television film was in development under the working title The Amazing World of Gumball Movie. On September 21, 2021, Cartoon Network announced that the upcoming film had been greenlit under the title The Amazing World of Gumball: The Movie!, with original series creator Ben Bocquelet serving as director and executive producer. The film would focus on Gumball's biggest fan finding a missing episode from the television show and accidentally opening a portal that connects Gumball's cartoon world to his own. After meeting the characters, they'll join Gumball, Darwin, Anais, Richard, and Nicole in saving Elmore from a nefarious menace looking to overtake the town. It would act as the "epic conclusion" to the original series and establish the world for a new accompanying show with the working title The Amazing World of Gumball: The Series. On August 22, 2022, the film was announced as one of six projects that will no longer be debuting on the streamer HBO Max, but will instead be shopped at a different outlet. Bocquelet later said in a September 1, 2022 tweet, that the film's fate is "a bit of a Schrödinger's cat question". He still expressed hope that the film will continue at some point. On December 13, 2022, the LinkedIn page of The Heroic Quest of the Valiant Prince Ivandoe series producer Emma Fernando confirmed that she will be the series producer of The Amazing World of Gumballs "seventh season".

Broadcast
The first two seasons were released on Cartoon Network channels in over 126 countries, with the third season rolling out through 2014.

The series debuted on Cartoon Network UK on May 2, 2011, one day before the US premiere.

The show aired on Boomerang from December 1, 2014, to October 23, 2015, its second run from February 1, 2016, to April 2, 2017, and its third run since May 2, 2022.

Reception

Critical reception
The Amazing World of Gumball received critical acclaim. In a favorable review, Brian Lowry of Variety described the series as "mostly a really clever spin on domestic chaos" and "first-rate silliness." Ken Tucker of Entertainment Weekly was also positive, writing: "There are few examples of mainstream children's programming as wildly imaginative, as visually and narratively daring, as The Amazing World of Gumball."

The A.V. Clubs Noel Murray graded the DVD release of the series' first 12 episodes a B+, writing that "what sets [The Amazing World of Gumball] apart from the many other super-silly, semi-anarchic cartoons on cable these days is that it features such a well-developed world, where even with the eclectic character designs, there are recognisable traits and tendencies." Wired writer Z noted that the series "manages to have genuine heart even as the plots themselves transition from well-worn TV tropes to all out madness."

Ratings
On May 3, 2011, the series premiere of The Amazing World of Gumball was watched by 2.120 million viewers in the United States. "The Goons" is currently the highest viewed episode of the series, with 2.72 million viewers. "The Potion" is the lowest viewed episode with only 0.42 million viewers, approximately 15% of its series high.

Awards and nominations

Comic books
On June 18, 2014, Boom! Studios began publishing The Amazing World of Gumball comic book series, which would end in 2015 after 8 issues. The series was written by Frank Gibson and illustrated by Tyson Hesse.

Home media

Notes

References

External links

 Official website
 Official page for The Amazing World of Gumball at Cartoon Network
 
 

 
2011 American television series debuts
2019 American television series endings
2011 British television series debuts
2019 British television series endings
2010s American animated television series
2010s British animated television series
2010s American satirical television series
2010s British satirical television series
2010s American sitcoms
2010s British sitcoms
2010s American black comedy television series
2010s British black comedy television series
2010s American children's comedy television series
2010s American school television series
2010s American surreal comedy television series
American animated sitcoms
American children's animated adventure television series
American children's animated comedy television series
American children's animated fantasy television series
British children's animated adventure television series
British children's animated comedy television series
British children's animated fantasy television series
American computer-animated television series
British computer-animated television series
American flash animated television series
British flash animated television series
American stop-motion animated television series
British stop-motion animated television series
Film and television memes
Annie Award winners
Boom! Studios titles
English-language television shows
Cartoon Network original programming
American television series with live action and animation
British television series with live action and animation
Metafictional television series
American surreal comedy television series
Middle school television series
American television shows featuring puppetry
British television shows featuring puppetry
Animated television series about brothers
Animated television series about cats
Animated television series about children
Animated television series about families
Animated television series about fish
Animated television series about rabbits and hares
Television shows adapted into comics
Television shows set in California
Television series by Hanna-Barbera Studios Europe
International Emmy Award winners
BAFTA winners (television series)